The 2022 UCI Para-cycling Track World Championships were held from 20 to 23 October 2022, at the Vélodrome National in Saint-Quentin-en-Yvelines, France.

Results

Men

Women

Mixed

Medal table

References

External links
Results
Results book

UCI Para-cycling Track World Championships
Para-cycling
UCI Para-cycling
UCI Para-cycling
International cycle races hosted by France
UCI